The Zijlstra cabinet was the executive branch of the Dutch Government from 22 November 1966 until 5 April 1967. The cabinet was formed by the christian-democratic Catholic People's Party (KVP) and the Anti-Revolutionary Party (ARP) after the fall of the previous Cabinet Cals. The caretaker rump cabinet was a centrist coalition and had a minority in the House of Representatives with former Protestant Leader Jelle Zijlstra a former Minister of Finance serving as Prime Minister and dual served as Minister of Finance. Former Catholic Prime Minister Jan de Quay served as Deputy Prime Minister and Minister of Transport and Water Management, Protestant Leader Barend Biesheuvel continued as Deputy Prime Minister, Minister of Agriculture and Fisheries and the responsibility for Suriname and Netherlands Antilles Affairs from previous cabinet.

The cabinet served in the middle of the tumultuous 1960s, domestically it had to deal with the counterculture and its primary objective was to make preparations for a snap election in 1967. Following the election the cabinet continued in a demissionary capacity until it was replaced by the De Jong cabinet.

Formation
Following the fall of the Cals cabinet the Labour Party (PvdA) left the coalition and the Catholic People's Party and the Anti-Revolutionary Party formed a Rump cabinet.

Term
Such a transitional cabinet is not supposed to take important decisions, but it still resolved the issue over the introduction of commercial television, which had been a major issue in the two previous cabinets, with the omroepwet, which allowed commercial blocks on public television (between shows), despite protests by VVD and part of CHU.

Cabinet Members

Trivia
 Four cabinet members (later) served as Prime Minister: Jelle Zijlstra (1966–1967), Jan de Quay (1959–1963), Barend Biesheuvel (1971–1973) and Piet de Jong (1967–1971).
 Six cabinet members had previous experience as scholars and professors: Jelle Zijlstra (Public Economics), Jan de Quay (Applied Psychology and Business Theory), Koos Verdam (International and Roman Law), Gerard Veldkamp (Microeconomics), Isaäc Arend Diepenhorst (Criminal Law and Procedure) and Louis Bartels (Health Economics), both Koos Verdam and Isaäc Arend Diepenhorst had also served as Rector Magnificus of the Free University Amsterdam.

References

External links
Official

  Kabinet-Zijlstra Parlement & Politiek
  Kabinet-Zijlstra Rijksoverheid

Cabinets of the Netherlands
1966 establishments in the Netherlands
1967 disestablishments in the Netherlands
Cabinets established in 1966
Cabinets disestablished in 1967
Caretaker governments
Minority governments